Shweta Agarwal is an Indian actress who has appeared in feature films such as Raghavendra (2003), Tandoori Love (2008), and Shaapit (2010). She is the wife of television host and Bollywood singer, Aditya Narayan.

Filmography

Films

References

External links
 Shweta Agarwal on IMDb

21st-century Indian actresses
Actresses in Hindi cinema
Indian film actresses
Living people
Year of birth missing (living people)